Margot Dalton is a pseudonym used by Phyllis Strobell to write contemporary romance novels.

Dalton has been nominated for a Romantic Times Career Achievement Award and for a Romantic Times Reviewers' Choice Award for Fourth Horseman.  Her novel Another Woman was developed into a made-for-TV movie in 1994, starring Justine Bateman.

Bibliography

Novels
Magic and Moonbeams (1990)
Sagebrush and Sunshine (1990)
Under Prairie Skies (1990)
Ask Me Anything (1991)
Three Waifs and a Daddy (1991)
Sunflower (1992)
Daniel and the Lion (1992)
Juniper (1992)
Tumbleweed (1992)
Another Woman (1993)
Angels in the Light (1993)
Kim and the Cowboy (1994)
Southern Nights (1994)
The Heart Won't Lie (1994)
Mustang Heart (1994)
Never Givin' Up on Love (1994)
Man of My Dreams (1995)
The Secret Years (1995)
A Family Likeness (1996)
Tangled Lives (1996)
Memories of You (1997)
First Impression (1997)
Second Thoughts (1998)
Third Choice (1998)
Fourth Horseman (1999)
Consequences (2000)
Even the Nights Are Better (2000)
New Way to Fly (2000)

Omnibus
My Valentine February 1994 (1994) (with Marisa Carroll, Muriel Jensen and Karen Young)
New Year's Resolution: Baby (1996) (with JoAnn Ross and Anne Stuart)
Christmas Delivery (1997) (with Margaret St. George and Dallas Schulze)
Marriage for Keeps (2004) (with Gina Wilkins and Karen Young)

References

External links
 

Living people
American romantic fiction writers
American women novelists
Women romantic fiction writers
Year of birth missing (living people)
21st-century American women